Caritas Bangladesh is a Catholic charitable organization in Bangladesh. It is a member of Caritas Internationalis and governed by the Catholic Bishops' Conference of Bangladesh.

History 
Caritas Bangladesh was founded in 1967 as the eastern branch of Caritas Pakistan. After the 1970 Bhola cyclone, it was re-organised and renamed as Christian Organisation for Relief and Rehabilitation (CORR). It became a national organisation on January 13, 1971.

After the independence of Bangladesh, it was re-registered under the Societies Registration Act, 1860 in 1972. It was renamed as Caritas Bangladesh in 1976. On, April 22, 1981, Caritas got registered under the NGO Affairs Bureau of Bangladesh.

Regional offices 
The headquarter of Caritas Bangladesh is located at Shantibagh in Dhaka. Moreover, It has eight diocesan offices in Barishal, Chattogram, Dhaka, Dinajpur, Khulna, Mymensingh, Rajshahi and Sylhet.

Trusts and Projects 
 Caritas Development Institute
 CORR–The Jute Works
 Mirpur Agriculture Workshop and Training Schools
 Bangladesh Rehabilitation and Assistance Center for Addicts (BARACA)

Emergency Responses 
Caritas Bangladesh has responded to the Cyclone Amphan, Cyclone Bulbul, 2017 floods in Bangladesh, Cyclone Sidr, etc. It also continues to respond to ongoing national crises including the COVID-19 pandemic, and Rohingya refugee crisis.

Reference

External links
 
 
 
 

1967 establishments in East Pakistan
Caritas Internationalis
Catholic Church in Bangladesh
Charities based in Bangladesh
Bangladeshi subsidiaries of foreign companies
Christian organizations established in 1967
Religious organisations based in Bangladesh